Ali Shiham (born 26 June 1975) is a former Maldivian international footballer.

International career
Ali Shiham has appeared in FIFA World Cup qualifying matches for Maldives.

He is well known as the first player to score a hat-trick for Maldives national team in their 22 years of international football on 11 January 2003 against Bhutan at Bangabandhu National Stadium during the 2003 South Asian Football Federation Gold Cup group stage.

Outside football
Shiham was offered to act in a Maldivian video song in 2003 for a fee of 20,000 MVR and he accepted the deal as it came from a very close friend of him; producer Ahmed Moosa (Ammaty).

References

External links
 
 

1975 births
Living people
Maldivian footballers
Maldives international footballers
Club Valencia players
New Radiant S.C. players
Association football forwards